Brandon Myers (born September 4, 1985) is a former American football tight end. He was drafted by the Oakland Raiders in the sixth round of the 2009 NFL Draft. He played college football at Iowa.

Myers has also played for the New York Giants and Tampa Bay Buccaneers.

College career
Myers played college football at Iowa where he totaled 56 receptions for 665 yards and 9 touchdowns in four years. He was named first-team All-Big Ten by conference coaches during his senior season, when he ranked third on the team in receptions (34) and yards (441), and tied for Hawkeyes lead with four touchdown receptions.

Professional career

Oakland Raiders 
Myers was drafted by the Oakland Raiders in the 6th round with the 202nd overall pick in the 2009 NFL Draft. In a game against the Cleveland Browns, on December 2, 2012 Myers tied a Raiders franchise record by recording his 14th reception of the game. He caught for 130 yards and 1 touchdown in the game.

New York Giants
Myers was signed by the New York Giants on March 16, 2013.  He was given a one-year deal worth $2.25 million with a $1.5 million signing bonus. He was released from the Giants after one season.

Tampa Bay Buccaneers
On March 11, 2014, Myers signed a two-year, $4 million contract with the Tampa Bay Buccaneers.

References

External links
Oakland Raiders bio
Iowa Hawkeyes bio
ESPN bio

1985 births
Living people
People from Jasper County, Iowa
Players of American football from Iowa
American football tight ends
Iowa Hawkeyes football players
Oakland Raiders players
New York Giants players
Tampa Bay Buccaneers players